Mount Owen is the highest summit of the Ruby Range of the Rocky Mountains of North America.

Mountain

See also

List of Colorado mountain ranges
List of Colorado mountain summits
List of Colorado fourteeners
List of Colorado 4000 meter prominent summits
List of the most prominent summits of Colorado
List of Colorado county high points

References

External links
 

Mountains of Gunnison County, Colorado
Gunnison National Forest
Mountains of Colorado
North American 3000 m summits